Nathan Vervaeke (born 5 September 1992) is a Belgian male badminton player.

Achievements

BWF International Challenge/Series
Mixed Doubles

 BWF International Challenge tournament
 BWF International Series tournament
 BWF Future Series tournament

References

External links
 

1992 births
Living people
Belgian male badminton players